Marawaan Bantam (born 24 November 1977 in Cape Town, Western Cape) is a South African association football midfielder for Cape Town All Stars in the National First Division.

He hails from Bonteheuwel on the Cape Flats.

External links
Profile at ABSAPremiership.co.za

1977 births
Association football midfielders
Living people
Sportspeople from Cape Town
South African soccer players
Bidvest Wits F.C. players
Santos F.C. (South Africa) players
Cape Coloureds